Trafalgar Township was a township in Ontario, Canada. It today  forms parts of Oakville, Milton, Halton Hills and Mississauga.

Named after Cape Trafalgar where Horatio Nelson led the English fleet to victory over the Spanish and French at the Battle of Trafalgar, the township was created in 1806. Trafalgar was one of three townships surveyed by Samuel Street Wilmot after the purchase of land from the Mississaugas in 1805.

The boundaries extended from Lake Ontario in the south to Steeles Avenue in the north, and from Winston Churchill Boulevard in the east to Burloak Drive in the west. In 1962, the township was amalgamated into Oakville. Dundas Street was the main transportation corridor through the township.

Wheat was the main agricultural crop of farms in the township for most of its history with the crop taking up from one quarter to one third of the cultivated land.

See also
List of townships in Ontario

References

External links
 Trafalgar Township Historical Society
 Illustrated Historical Atlas of Halton County.

Oakville, Ontario
Former townships in Ontario
History of the Regional Municipality of Halton